John Glendy Sproston (14 August 1828 – 8 June 1862) was an officer in the United States Navy during the Civil War. He was killed in action in a riverine action in Florida.

Biography
John G. Sproston was born in Maryland. He was the eldest son of  George Saxon Sproston, a U.S. naval surgeon, and Jane Glendy, a daughter of the Rev John Glendy, former Chaplain of the United States Senate. He was appointed to the Naval Academy in 1846. He subsequently served with the Pacific Squadron during the war with Mexico. In 1854, Sproston voyaged to Japan with the Perry (Matthew Calbraith Perry) Expedition.

During the Civil War, he served as commanding officer of Powhatan and as executive officer of Seneca. On 1 November 1861, during the Battle of Port Royal, Sproston personally fired many of the 11-inch guns on board Seneca as the crew was new and untrained. Lt. Sproston was killed on 8 June 1862, while on a boat expedition to destroy a Confederate privateer in the St. Johns River in Florida.

Both John Sproston and his father are buried in Green Mount Cemetery in Baltimore, Maryland.

Namesakes
USS Sproston (DD-173) and USS Sproston (DD-577) were named for him.

Notes

References

1828 births
1862 deaths
United States Navy officers
People of Maryland in the American Civil War
United States Naval Academy alumni
Union military personnel killed in the American Civil War
Burials at Green Mount Cemetery